Dalgona or ppopgi is a Korean candy made with melted sugar and baking soda originating from South Korea. It was a popular street snack from the 1970s and 1980s, and is still eaten as a retro food. When a pinch of baking soda is mixed into melted sugar, the thermal decomposition of the baking soda releases carbon dioxide, which makes the liquidized sugar puff up, and it becomes a light and crunchy candy once cooled and hardened. Typically, the creamy beige liquid is poured on a flat surface, pressed flat, and stamped using a cookie cutter giving off the image on the candy such as  a star or a heart. Eaters try to trim their way around the outline on the snack without breaking the picture as a challenge. Traditionally, if this trimming is completed without breaking the candy, the consumer receives another free dalgona by the seller.

Modern cafes in Korea serve novel dalgona coffee beverages where dalgona-flavoured coffee cream is heaped on top of iced tea or coffee, as well as pastries such as scones. Some cafes also used dalgona to launch desserts such as bingsu and souffle.

Dalgona appeared in an episode of the Netflix series Squid Game, with a deadly version of the dalgona challenge being the second game played in the series. The success and the international popularity of the show led to a revival of the candy's popularity in South Korea along with the rising prevalence around the world. Sales have doubled for street vendors as foreigners become more interested. People have also taken to social media such as TikTok and YouTube to make their own candy at home as a challenge and as a cooking recipe.

Name 
Dalgona was originally a term specific for expensive candies that use glucose which did not use a mold, while ppopgi was originally candies that use sugar and thus could be easily molded into shapes such as stars and circles. Due to problems with dalgona regarding its susceptibility to mould, the word dalgona began to refer to the same food as ppopgi. In the Gyeonggi Province, including Seoul and Incheon, it was mainly called dalgona and ppopgi, but the names vary from region to region.

 ttigi: Representatively, it was used in Daejeon, and other regions were used in most of Chungcheong Province except Cheongju and most of Jeolla Province except Gwangju. Ttigi reflects the characteristics of Chungcheong and Jeolla dialects in which the vowel e(ㅔ) is converted into i(ㅣ), and when changed to a standard language, it becomes ttegi(떼기).
 gukja: It was mainly used in Daegu and North Gyeongsang Province, and it is said to have been called a gukja (ladle) because it was made and eaten in a ladle. In addition, it was also called pajjakkung, but it is not as strong as a gukja.
 jjokja: It was mainly used in the South Gyeongsang Province, and it is presumed to have originated from the dialect of the ladle, but it is not accurate.
 orittegi / orittigi (/): It was mainly used in Masan and is said to have originated from the dialect of "cutting (오려|oreo) and pulling (떼기|ttegi)".
 ttong-gwaja: In Busan, it is said that it was also called ttong-gwaja in addition to jjokja. As the name suggests, it was called ttong-gwaja (poop cookie) because it looked like a poop.
 ttegi: It is said that in Jeju Island, like Chungcheong and Jeolla, it was called ttegi by borrowing the standard language itself without transforming it into ttigi, a dialect form. Exceptionally, it is said that it was also called tikka in some areas of Seogwipo.

From the 1970-80s to the early 2000s, when the popularity of ppopgi was in full swing, the media had little influence, so the names were different for each region. However, generations later, the spread of smartphones and the influence of the media from the Gyeonggi region have increased, which the other regions became naturally exposed to the media. Since then, these regional names have become more obscure, and most middle and high school students simply now call them dalgona.

Gallery

See also 

 Dalgona coffee
 Honeycomb toffee
 Katanuki
 Korean cuisine
 List of Korean desserts
 North Korean cuisine
 South Korean cuisine
 Street food in South Korea

References 

Candy
South Korean confectionery
2020s fads and trends